The Plovdiv Philharmonic Orchestra was a Bulgarian orchestra whose origins date back to 1945. It is rooted in the hundred-year-old orchestral traditions of the largest cultural center of Thrace. The German neo-classical band Haggard performed with them as part of their Tales of Ithiria tour in 2010, marking their first live concert with an actual orchestra.  At 2012, the orchestra was closed and not working anymore.

Recordings
Mozart Opera Arias for Mezzo-Soprano and Orchestra – Irena Petkova (mezzo-soprano), Plovdiv Philharmonic Orchestra, Nayden Todorov (conductor), 1999. Label: Music Minus One. 
 Robert Schumann - Piano Concerto in A. Ivan Drenikov, piano. Dobrin Petkov, conductor BALKANTON LP BCA 10290, CD Balkanton 030197/ Castle Communications / St.Clair
 L.V.Beethoven - Piano Concerto N°4 in G. Ivan Drenikov, piano. Dobrin Petkov, conductor Live Sofia 1979 BALKANTON CD 030197

1945 establishments in Bulgaria
2012 disestablishments in Bulgaria
Bulgarian orchestras
Disbanded orchestras
Musical groups established in 1945
Musical groups disestablished in 2012